The 1997–98 season was Heart of Midlothian F.C.s 15th consecutive season of play in the Scottish Premier Division. Hearts also competed in the Scottish Cup and the Scottish League Cup.

Fixtures

Friendlies

League Cup

Scottish Cup

Scottish Premier Division

Scottish Premier Division table

Stats

Scorers

See also
List of Heart of Midlothian F.C. seasons

References

External links 
 Official Club website
 Complete Statistical Record

Heart of Midlothian F.C. seasons
Heart of Midlothian